Just One Night is the fourth studio album by English singer Samantha Fox. It was released on 21 June 1991 by Jive Records. In addition to longtime collaborators Full Force, the album also features production from Robert Clivillés and David Cole of C+C Music Factory. The lead single, "(Hurt Me! Hurt Me!) But the Pants Stay On", had some radio airplay, but failed to receive much attention. The album's second single, "Another Woman (Too Many People)", remixed for radio, charted moderately in some continental European countries. The radio remix of "Another Woman (Too Many People)", along with the third single, "Just One Night", and fourth single, "Spirit of America", written by Mama's Boys member Pat McManus and featuring a guitar solo by Glenn Tipton of Judas Priest, were subsequently included on Fox's 1992 Greatest Hits album.

On 25 June 2012, the album was reissued as a two-disc deluxe edition by Cherry Red Records in the United Kingdom, including bonus tracks and remixes.

Critical reception
Chuck Eddy from Entertainment Weekly gave the album an A, writing, "Who follows an insanely impudent single called ”(Hurt Me! Hurt Me!) But the Pants Stay On” with a medley of two of disco’s most X-rated hits ever (Andrea True Connection’s ”More, More, More” and Donna Summer’s ”Love to Love You Baby”)? Samantha fox, a smart Cockney hussy, who ensures right off that we hear her fourth album, Just One Night, as a G-spot manifesto. She’s hilarious; Madonna should retire to a convent."

Track listing

Notes
  signifies a remixer
  signifies an additional producer

Personnel
Credits adapted from the liner notes of Just One Night.

Musicians

 Samantha Fox – vocals ; background vocals 
 Full Force – arrangement, the "Hurt Me" chants ; music, background vocals 
 Alex "Spanador" Mosely – guitar 
 Ex-Girlfriend – background vocals ; "Hurt Me" chants 
 Dana "The Dog" Loprieno – the "Hurt Me" chants 
 Marc "Long Carcass" Singleton – the "Hurt Me" chants 
 Tim "Jimmy Olsen" Latham – the "Hurt Me" chants 
 Eric Gast – the "Hurt Me" chants 
 Cheryl "Pepsi" Riley – background vocals 
 Vincent Henry – saxophone solo 
 Robert Clivillés – arrangement, drums, percussion 
 David Cole – arrangement, keyboards 
 Alan Friedman – programming, additional drum programming 
 Paul Pesco – guitar 
 Deborah Cooper – background vocals 
 Martha Wash – background vocals 
 Craig Derry – background vocals 
 Audrey Wheeler – background vocals 
 Ralf René Maué – arrangement 
 Detlef Reshöft – keyboards, strings, sequencer, drum programming 
 Nils Tuxen – guitar 
 Rolf Köhler – background vocals 
 Madeleine Lang – background vocals 
 Michael Scholz – background vocals 
 Marion Schwaiger – background vocals 
 Eric Foster White – keyboards, drum programming ; arrangement 
 Nunzio Signore – guitar 
 Tim Cashion – background vocals 
 Jon Durno – keyboards, guitar ; bass 
 Mark Sayfritz – keyboards, programming 
 Maggie Ryder – background vocals 
 Randall Waller – background vocals 
 Paul Taylor – keyboards, programming 
 Lol Ford – guitar 
 Lauraine McIntosh – background vocals 
 Chris Marshall – keyboards, programming 
 Glenn Tipton – guitar solo 
 Jeffrey Rose – guitar 
 Martyn Ford – drums 
 Nigel Rush – background vocals 
 Joshua Michael Grau – guitars

Technical

 Full Force – production, mixing 
 Tony Maserati – mixing, engineering 
 Dana Loprieno – engineering assistance 
 Pete Christensen – mix engineering assistance ; editing ; engineering assistance 
 Danny Mormando – engineering assistance 
 Michael Scalcione – engineering assistance 
 James Young – remix, remix engineering ; production, engineering 
 Liz Winstanley – remix 
 Anthony Saunders – engineering assistance 
 Robert Clivillés – production, mixing 
 David Cole – production, mixing 
 Acar S. Key – engineering, mix engineering 
 Alec Head – engineering 
 Ricky Crespo – edits 
 Ralf René Maué – production, mixing 
 Detlef Reshöft – mixing 
 Def Geoff Hunt – remix ; engineering 
 Eric Foster White – production, engineering 
 Mike Allaire – mixing 
 Tom Vercillo – engineering 
 Chris Floberg – engineering 
 Tim Latham – engineering assistance 
 Will Tartak – engineering assistance ; engineering 
 Jim Munn – engineering assistance ; engineering 
 Nigel Green – production 
 Jon Durno – production 
 Paul Taylor – production 
 José Rodriguez – mastering

Artwork
 Joe Grant – photography
 Zombart JK – design
 Diana Merkel – calligraphy

Charts

Notes

References

1991 albums
Albums produced by David Cole (record producer)
Albums produced by Full Force
Albums recorded at Sigma Sound Studios
Jive Records albums
Samantha Fox albums